Cai Chongda (born May 27, 1982) is a Chinese journalist, magazine editor, and writer, best known for his memoir, Vessel: A Memoir. He currently serves as the executive editor of China News Weekly.

Early life and education
Cai was born on May 27, 1982, in the seaside town of Dongshi, Fujian, China to an underprivileged family. At the age of 16, he won first place at a national composition competition, and published a book the following year. He attended Quanzhou Normal University, and graduated with a bachelor's degree in 2004.

Career 
At 24, Cai became the News Editor of Modern Weekly, a Chinese magazine. At the age of 27, Cai became Director of Reporting at GQ China, becoming the youngest person to hold this position across GQ's 17 international branches. In 2015, he founded Magmode, a menswear brand.

Works
In 2014, he published the essay collection, Pínáng (皮囊). The book became a bestseller in China, Hong Kong, and Taiwan, selling over 3 million copies in China. In 2021, it was translated by Dylan Levi King into English, published under the title Vessel: A Memoir. Vessel's film rights have since been purchased by Andy Lau, a Hong Kong actor.

References

1982 births
Living people
21st-century Chinese writers
Chinese magazine editors
Short story writers from Fujian
People from Jinjiang, Fujian